Qezel Otaq (also Romanized as Qezel Oţāq; also known as Qezel Atav’ārab) is a village in Golidagh Rural District, Golidagh District, Maraveh Tappeh County, Golestan Province, Iran. At the 2006 census, its population was 275, in 53 families.

References 

Populated places in Maraveh Tappeh County